The 2011 Kraft Nabisco Championship was played at Mission Hills Country Club in Rancho Mirage, California, from March 31 – April 3. This was the 40th edition of the Kraft Nabisco Championship and its 29th year as a women's major golf championship.

Stacy Lewis shot 69 (−3) in the final round to win her first major, three strokes ahead of runner-up Yani Tseng, the defending champion, 54-hole leader, and number one player in the women's world rankings. It was also her first official victory on the LPGA Tour.

Past champions in the field

Made the cut

Missed the cut

Source:

Round summaries

First round
Thursday, March 31, 2011

Source:

Second round
Friday, April 1, 2011

Source:

Third round
Saturday, April 2, 2011

Source:

Final round
Sunday, April 3, 2011

Source:

Scorecard
Final round

Cumulative tournament scores, relative to par

Source:

References

External links
LPGA leaderboard source

Chevron Championship
Golf in California
Kraft Nabisco Championship
Kraft Nabisco Championship
Kraft Nabisco Championship
Kraft Nabisco Championship
Kraft Nabisco Championship